The 1944 Bunker Hill Naval Air Station Blockbusters football team represented Naval Air Station Bunker Hill in the 1944 college football season.  The team compiled a record 6–1.  Lieutenant Howard Kissell was the team's head coach until mid-October when he was reassigned overseas and replaced by Lieutenant Commander Len Watters.

Schedule

References

Bunker Hill Naval Air Station
Bunker Hill Naval Air Station Blockbusters football
Bunker Hill Naval Air Station Blockbusters football